Epping St John's School, formerly known as St John's Church of England Voluntary Controlled School, is a school in Epping, Essex.

Epping St. John's was established in September 2013. The school is mixed-sex or coeducational. The previous St Johns C of E secondary school building was located in Tower Road, Epping.

The school's main drivers  
Living well together
Dignity and respect
Develop wisdom in all
Courageous education with character
The highest hopes and aspirations

School vision
"To belong to the Christian family of ESJ is to strive for the exceptional. ESJ is a place where all are freed to succeed within an environment of hope, dignity and respect & the very highest expectations. ESJ strives to be the heartbeat of our local community where students are not only given the opportunity to succeed but also the courage to develop into exceptional members of society, equipped with the tools that they need to smash through any barriers and fulfil their life-long potential".

Motto
 Be ASPIRTIONAL: Creating possibilities – Achieving potential
 Be COURAGEOUS: Putting learning first - Persistence with a purpose
 Be EXCEPTIONAL      Activating awareness - Accelerating progress

Ethos
"To belong to ESJ is an honour. We strive to be aspirational, courageous and to reach a potential which is not limited but gives us the wings to be exceptional with a shared sense of purpose with Christian values at the heart of all that we do".

Notable alumni
 Garth Jennings
 Alfie Scully

References

External links
Epping St John's School official website

Secondary schools in Essex
Church of England secondary schools in the Diocese of Chelmsford
Academies in Essex